Boobook may refer to:
 Boobook,  a common name for many species of owl in the genus Ninox
 Boobook, journal of the Australasian Raptor Association
 Boobook Society, an association of academics founded by John Latham and Frederic Eggleston